In Greek mythology, Thrasos (Ancient Greek: Θράσος) is the personified concept of boldness.

Although the word θράσος itself could be used both in the positive ("courage") and the negative ("over-boldness, insolence") senses, in the only context where Thrasos appears as a personification (a daemon), it is definitely a malicious and suspicious being, mentioned together with Hybris and Atë and opposed to Dike.

According to Euripides in his play Agamemnon:
 But an old Hubris tends to bring forth in evil men, sooner or later, at the fated hour of birth, a young Hubris and that irresistible, unconquerable, unholy spirit, Recklessness [Thrasos], and for the household black Curses, which resemble their parents.

Notes

References 
 Aeschylus, Agamemnon in Aeschylus, with an English translation by Herbert Weir Smyth, Ph. D. in two volumes, Vol 2, Cambridge, Massachusetts, Harvard University Press, 1926. Online version at the Perseus Digital Library.

Greek gods
Personifications in Greek mythology
Daimons
Courage